Kirkebygden is the administrative centre of Våler municipality, Østfold, Norway. Its population as of 2005 was 738.

Villages in Østfold